Andrey Gennadyevich Alshevskikh (born 14 May 1972, Sverdlovsk) is a Russian political figure, war criminal, deputy of the 6th, 7th, and 8th State Dumas convocations. From 2006 to 2016,  he was a member of the Communist Party of the Russian Federation. He left the party, in his words, because he was constantly "purposefully suspended from work". Later the same year, he run for the State Duma with the United Russia. In 2021, he co-authored the law "On Amendments to the Federal Law "On Education in the Russian Federation", which introduced the concept of "educational activity" and came into effect on 1 June 2021. Alshevskikh is married and has two children.

References

1972 births
Living people
Politicians from Yekaterinburg
United Russia politicians
21st-century Russian politicians
Eighth convocation members of the State Duma (Russian Federation)
Seventh convocation members of the State Duma (Russian Federation)
Sixth convocation members of the State Duma (Russian Federation)